Diary is the third and final studio album by Shiori Takei, released on April 18, 2007 under Giza Studio label. The album is consist of four previous released singles, such as Sakura Iro, Kitto Mou Koi ni wa Naranai, Like a little Love and Yume no Tsuzuki. The album charted at #48 on the Oricon charts in its first week. It charted for 2 weeks and sold 3,974 copies. Before she retired she released one mini and a compilation album.

Track listing

Personnel
Credits adapted from the CD booklet of Diary.

Shiori Takei – vocals, songwriting, composing, whistling, piano
Ohga Yoshinobu (OOM) - guitar
Hiroshi Asai (The★tambourines) - bass
Tetsuya Hashio (Nakedgrun) - guitar, bass
U-zo Ohkusu (OOM) - organ, piano, electronic piano
Keisuke Kuratamani (U-ka Saegusa in dB) - percussion, drum
Hitoshi Okamoto (Garnet Crow) - guitar, arranging
Atsushi Kanayama - drum
Takuto Unigame - bass
Tomoyuki Fujiwara - arranging, piano
Shinji Takashima - male vox
Koga Kazunori - guitar
Takahashi Tomomichi - flute
Souta Kishimoto - male vox
Gan Kojima – art direction
Kanonji - producing

Usage in media
Sakurairo: ending theme for TV Anime MÄR
Yume no Tsuzuki: ending theme for Tokyo TV program "Japan Countdown"
Like a Little Love: ending theme for "Music Japan" program "BREAK TV"
Kitto mou Koi ni wa Naranai: ending theme for Tokyo TV program "Japan Countdown"

References 

2007 albums
Shiori Takei albums
Being Inc. albums
Japanese-language albums
Giza Studio albums